Omorgus nodicollis is a species of hide beetle in the subfamily Omorginae.

References

nodicollis
Beetles described in 1888